And Once Again is the fifteenth studio album by American soul musician Isaac Hayes. The album was released in 1980, by Polydor Records. The album debuted at number 164 and reached number 59 on the Billboard 200.

Track listing
All tracks composed by Isaac Hayes; except where indicated

References

1980 albums
Isaac Hayes albums
albums produced by Isaac Hayes
Polydor Records albums